Clarence Felder (born September 2, 1938) is an American character actor who has starred in films and on television, and co-starred in ten Broadway productions. He is also a playwright and director. His play Captain Felder's Cannon was adapted as the feature film All for Liberty (2009), in which he starred.

Overview of career
Felder's first feature film performance was in Man on a Swing (1974); his other films include After Hours (1985), Ruthless People (1986), The Hidden (1987), The Last Boy Scout (1991), and The Ride (1997). He stars in the award-winning feature film All for Liberty (2009), portraying his ancestor, Capt. Henry Felder, an American Revolutionary War hero of the Backcountry of South Carolina. It was based on his play Captain Felder's Cannon.

His starring role on a television series was as Insp. Bobo Pritzger in ABC's 1980s hit series Hooperman. Felder has starred in many TV movies, including Playing for Time, The Mystery of the Morro Castle, and The Killing Floor. He has made numerous guest appearances on prime time TV series, including Kojak, Hill Street Blues, Alien Nation, Dream On, L.A. Law, and NYPD Blue.

On Broadway, Felder co-starred with Christopher Walken in Macbeth, with Glenn Close in Love for Love, Colleen Dewhurst in Queen & the Rebels, and Meryl Streep in Memory of Two Mondays. He played Debbie Harry's father in Teaneck Tanzi.

He is the co-founder of Actors' Theatre of South Carolina and their film division, Moving Images Group.

Personal life
Felder was born and grew up in St. Matthews, South Carolina, where his family had deep historical roots. He went away to college and became involved in acting, spending much of his career in Hollywood. He is married to actress/writer/director, Chris Weatherhead. He has one daughter, Helen Huggins.

Filmography
 1974 Man on a Swing as Coach
 1977 The Goodbye Girl as Critic
 1979 The Seduction of Joe Tynan as Golf Pro
 1980 Below the Belt as Unknown 
 1982 The Neighborhood as Crony
 1983 Touched as Ralph
 1983 Slayground as Orxel
 1985 The Killing Floor as Unknown
 1985 After Hours as Bouncer
 1985 Marie as Jack Lowery
 1986 Ruthless People as Lieutenant Walters
 1987 Amazing Grace and Chuck as Dick Ferguson
 1987 The Hidden as Lieutenant John Masterson
 1989 A Nightmare on Elm Street 5: The Dream Child as Mr. Gray
 1991 The Last Boy Scout as Detective Mick McCaskey
 1993 Reckless Kelly as Hollywood Police Lieutenant
 1997 The Ride as Mike Stillwell
 2009 All for Liberty as Captain Henry Felder
 2010 Republic of Pete as Barlow
 2010 Angel Camouflaged as Mr. Carl

External links
 
 

1938 births
American male stage actors
American male film actors
American male television actors
Living people
Actresses from Columbia, South Carolina
People from St. Matthews, South Carolina
21st-century American women